Deh-e Bar Aftab Vali-ye Jowkar (also Romanized as Deh-e Bar Āftāb Valī-ye Jowkār; also known as Deh-e Bar Āftāb) is a village in Margown Rural District, Margown District, Boyer-Ahmad County, Kohgiluyeh and Boyer-Ahmad Province, Iran. At the 2006 census, its population was 36, in 5 families.

References 

Populated places in Boyer-Ahmad County